Sven Arne Henrik Nilsson (born January 10, 1970) is a Swedish retired professional ice hockey player. He played for Västra Frölunda HC and Västerås IK in Elitserien, and for Hammarby IF in Allsvenskan.

Career statistics

External links

1970 births
Frölunda HC players
Living people
Swedish ice hockey centres
VIK Västerås HK players
Swedish ice hockey player stubs